Harold Gilliam (1918 – December 14, 2016) was a San Francisco-based writer, newspaperman and environmentalist, a columnist for the San Francisco Chronicle and Examiner newspapers. The Harold Gilliam Award for Excellence in Environmental Reporting, given by The Bay Institute, is named in his honor.

Early life and education
Gilliam was born in Los Angeles and earned a bachelor's degree in political science from UCLA and a master's in economics from UC Berkeley; he later studied under Wallace Stegner at the Stanford Writing Program. He served in the 11th Armored Division in Europe in World War II.

Career
Gilliam began his career in journalism as a copy boy at the Chronicle, where he was soon made a reporter. In 1954 he became a freelancer, then in 1960 began an environmental column at the Examiner; the following year he returned to the Chronicle, where he continued his column, called "This Land",  until retiring in 1995.

San Francisco Bay, his first book, was on The New York Times bestseller list for 19 weeks. It led to his being invited to be a founder member of Save the Bay.

Gilliam was one of the first environmentalist journalists, and helped mobilize public opinion to save many features of the San Francisco Bay Area. In the 1960s, through an article and personal contacts, he helped achieve a Marin County ordinance forestalling the bulldozing of archaeological sites. His article "The Destruction of Mono Lake Is on Schedule", which appeared in the Examiner in March 1979, was one of the first public accounts of the then ongoing destruction of Mono Lake; in 1993 he was the first recipient of the Defender of the Trust award from the Mono Lake Committee. The Bay Institute named its Harold Gilliam Award in his honor. The group also gave him its Bay Education Award in 1995.

Personal life
Gilliam was married to Ann, with whom he co-wrote a book on Carmel, California; she died in 2001. They had two sons. Gilliam died in San Francisco in 2016 at the age of 98.

Bibliography
San Francisco Bay (1957)
(with Ann Gilliam, photographs by Fritz Busse) San Francisco: City At The Golden Gate (1959)
The Face of San Francisco (1960)
For Better or for Worse: The Ecology of an Urban Area (1972)
Island in time: The Point Reyes Peninsula (1973) 
Between the Devil & the Deep Blue Bay: The Struggle to Save San Francisco Bay (1969)
The San Francisco Experience: The Romantic Lore Behind the Fabulous Facade of the Bay Area (1972)
The Natural World of San Francisco (1967) 
(with Ann Gilliam) Creating Carmel: The Enduring Vision (1992)
Weather of the San Francisco Bay Region (1962; 2nd ed. 2002)

References

1918 births
2016 deaths
American non-fiction environmental writers
History of San Francisco
University of California, Los Angeles alumni
University of California, Berkeley alumni
United States Army personnel of World War II